Peter Robb (born 1946 in Toorak, Melbourne) is an Australian author.

Robb spent his formative years in Australia and New Zealand. As a young man he was involved in a small Trotskyist organisation named the Communist League, which was sympathetic to the Fourth International. Robb helped produced its newspaper, Militant, and was also key in the departure of a section of the Communist League's leadership, through absorption by the Socialist Workers Party  in 1976 (see Fusion Statement of SWP and ex-CL Group in  "Direct Action", 25 November 1976).

Robb left Australia 1978, and lived much of the time in Naples and southern Italy, interspersed with sojourns to Brazil. At the end of 1992 he returned to Sydney.  He experiences in Southern Italy were recounted in his first book, Midnight in Sicily, which was published in Australia in October 1996. In 1997 it won the non-fiction prize of the Victorian Premier's Literary Award, the Nettie Palmer Prize for Non-fiction,.

His second book, M, a biography of the Italian artist Caravaggio, was published in Australia in 1998, and went on to provoke controversy when it was published in Britain two years later. In December 1999, he published Pig's Blood and Other Fluids, a collection of three crime fiction novellas. In October 2003, Robb published his fourth book, A Death in Brazil, which was named The Age'''s non-fiction book of the year for 2004. In October 2010, his book Street Fight in Naples was published by Allen & Unwin.

He has taught at the University of Melbourne, the University of Oulu in Finland and the Istituto Universitario Orientale in Naples.

Bibliography

BooksMidnight in Sicily (1996)M (1998)Pig's Blood and Other Fluids (1999)A Death in Brazil (2003)Street Fight in Naples (2010)Lives (2012)

Essays and reporting

References

External links
 Profile and interview with The New York Times Book Review''

Australian crime writers
Australian non-fiction writers
Living people
The Monthly people
1946 births
Writers from Melbourne
Australian male novelists
Male non-fiction writers
People from Toorak, Victoria
Australian expatriates in Italy